Langley Mill is a town in Derbyshire, England.

Langley Mill may also refer to:

Langley Mill railway station, the current station in Langley Mill
Langley Mill railway station (Erewash Valley line), a former station in Langley Mill
Eastwood and Langley Mill railway station, a former station near Langley Mill

See also
Langley (disambiguation)